Katusha–Alpecin was a Russian (later Swiss) road bicycle racing team which competed at the UCI WorldTeam level using Canyon bikes. The team was created in 2008 by Igor Makarov within the framework of the previously established Russian Global Cycling Project, which was intended to help boost cycling in Russia. In 2017 the team took an international direction, still supported by Igor Makarov's company ARETI International Group, clothing company Katusha Sports and German shampoo manufacturer Alpecin. The team competed as a UCI ProTeam/WorldTour team between 2009 and 2019. Joaquim Rodríguez, Alexander Kristoff, Daniel Moreno, Simon Špilak, Filippo Pozzato, Luca Paolini, Ilnur Zakarin and Tony Martin are some of the most successful riders who rode for Katusha.

In 2019, the team was taken over by Israel Cycling Academy, along with its UCI World Tour license.

History 
The cycling project was launched on December 22, 2008, when Team Katusha was formed in Moscow. It was formed from the structure of Oleg Tinkov's Tinkoff Credit Systems. The team was practically organised by the Russian Global Cycling Project foundation, which itself is funded by Russian businesses such as Gazprom, Itera and Rostechnologii.

In its first official season it signed leading cyclists such as Robbie McEwen, Vladimir Karpets, Filippo Pozzato and Gert Steegmans. The team first raced at the 2009 Tour Down Under.

During the 2009 season, the team earned 23 wins. Some of the notable wins were Sergei Ivanov’s Amstel Gold victory, Filippo Pozzato's Italian road title and triumph at Giro del Veneto.

After the 2012 season, Katusha lost their UCI World Tour license, despite having in their ranks the champion of the 2012 season (Joaquim Rodríguez) and finishing the 2012 UCI World Tour team rankings in second position. The team appealed that decision before the Court of Arbitration for Sport and it was announced on 15 February 2013 that the decision of the UCI was overturned and that Katusha would be part of the 2013 UCI World Tour.

Its most successful season was 2015 when the team took victories in the Tour of Flanders, Gent-Wevelgem, Scheldeprijs and GP Ouest France – Plouay, as well as overall wins in the Tour of the Basque Country, Tour de Suisse and Tour de Romandie and stage wins in the Tour de France, Tour of Italy and Tour of Spain.

During the 2017 season, two staff members were videotaped dumping the team RV's septic system in a parking lot off the highway at the Amgen Tour of California. The California Highway Patrol and race organizers were informed of the incident and the waste was later professionally removed. The pair were suspended and sent home from the race.

In October 2019, Israel Cycling Academy completed the takeover of Katusha–Alpecin, including its World Tour license.

Doping 
In March 2009, Christian Pfannberger tested positive for EPO and was banned for life. In April of the same year Antonio Colom tested positive for EPO.

In 2011, a number of police searches led by the Padova authorities were conducted in Italy during April. The searches were linked to a broader doping investigation linked to Michele Ferrari. Katusha riders Vladimir Gusev, Mikhail Ignatiev, Vladimir Karpets and Alexandr Kolobnev were searched. Later in July, Kolobnev tested positive for Hydrochlorothiazide (HCT) on stage 5 of the 2011 Tour de France. Two weeks later Kolobnev's B-sample returned a positive for HCT.

In April 2012, Denis Galimzyanov tested positive for EPO in an out of competition test. Galimzyanov later admitted to taking the banned substance. In June 2012 Filippo Pozzato admitted to using the services of Dr Ferrari from 2004 to 2009.

In July 2015, Luca Paolini tested positive for cocaine (Benzoylecgonine metabolite) in a sample given on July 7 during the 2015 Tour de France. As a result, the team withdrew Paolini from the Tour de France. A month later, in August, Giampaolo Caruso returned an EPO positive from a sample taken in March 2012, which had been subsequently retested due to advances in detecting technology. He was suspended by the team awaiting testing of his B-sample.

In February 2016, Eduard Vorganov tested positive for the newly WADA-banned compound Meldonium. Due to the frequency of doping positives, the teams faced a potential 15- to 45-day ban.

Final roster

Major wins 

Since the creation of Team Katusha in 2009, its riders have won many races. As of January 2017, these included 28 stages in Grand Tours and four cycling monuments: the 2012 and 2013 Il Lombardia were won by Joaquim Rodríguez, and the 2014 Milan–San Remo and the 2015 Tour of Flanders were won by Alexander Kristoff.

Sponsorship 
In 2019, sponsors Alpecin and Canyon bikes confirmed that they were ending their sponsorship of the team, with Israel Cycling Academy buying the Katusha–Alpecin management company from Russian oligarch and UCI Management Committee member Igor Makarov.

National champions 

2009
 Italian Road Race, Filippo Pozzato
 Russian Road Race, Sergei Ivanov
2010
 Moldovan Road Race, Alexandre Pliuschin
 Russian Road Race, Alexandre Kolobnev
 Russian Time Trial, Vladimir Gusev
2011
 Russian Road Race, Pavel Brutt
 Russian Time Trial, Mikhail Ignatiev
 Belarusian Road Race, Aleksandr Kuschynski
 Moldovan Road Race, Alexandre Pliuschin
2012
 Russian Road Race, Eduard Vorganov
 Latvian Time Trial, Gatis Smukulis
 Russian Time Trial, Denis Menchov
2013
 Latvian Time Trial, Gatis Smukulis
 Russian Road Race, Vladimir Isaichev
2014
 Latvian Time Trial, Gatis Smukulis
 Russian Time Trial, Anton Vorobyev
 Russian Road Race, Alexander Porsev
2015
 Latvian Time Trial, Gatis Smukulis
 Russian Road Race, Yuri Trofimov
 Austrian Road Race, Marco Haller
2016
 Russian Time Trial, Sergey Chernetskiy
 Russian Road Race, Pavel Kochetkov
2017
 Russian Time Trial, Ilnur Zakarin
 German Time Trial, Tony Martin
 European Road Race, Alexander Kristoff
2019
 British Time Trial, Alex Dowsett

References

External links 

 

 
Former UCI WorldTeams
Cycling teams established in 2009
Cycling teams based in Russia
2009 establishments in Russia
Cycling teams based in Switzerland
Cycling teams established in 2017
2017 establishments in Switzerland
2019 disestablishments in Switzerland
Cycling teams disestablished in 2019